Concorde Stakes may refer to:

Concorde Stakes (Australia), a horse race held at Randwick Racecourse in Australia.
Concorde Stakes (Ireland), a horse race held at Tipperary Racecourse in Ireland.